Einar Niemi (born 16 September 1943) is a Norwegian historian, born in Nord-Varanger, Finnmark. 

He is known for his study of the history of ethnical minorities, and for his contributions to administration of cultural heritage of Northern Norway. Among his publications is the book Den finske fare from 1981 (co-authored with Knut Einar Eriksen).

References

1943 births
Living people
People from Vadsø
20th-century Norwegian historians
Academic staff of the University of Tromsø
Royal Norwegian Society of Sciences and Letters